String Quartet No. 2 is the one of a series of seventeen works in the genre by the Brazilian composer Heitor Villa-Lobos, and was written in 1915. A performance lasts approximately twenty minutes.

History
Villa-Lobos composed his Second Quartet in 1915, either in Rio de Janeiro or Nova Friburgo. It was first performed on 3 February 1917 by a quartet consisting of Judith Barcellos and Dagmar Noronha Gitahy, violins, Orlando Frederico, viola, and Alfredo Gomes, cello. The published score bears the indication  "Op. 56".

Analysis
As in the all of Villa-Lobos's quartets except the first, there are four movements:
 Allegro non troppo
 Scherzo: Allegro
 Andante
 Allegro deciso – Presto – Prestissimo final

One writer, however, regards the Prestissimo final as a separate, fifth movement.

This early quartet in Villa-Lobos's catalogue is composed according to the cyclic principles developed by César Franck and Vincent d'Indy. Franck and Debussy were two of the most important influences on Villa-Lobos's early style, and he had studied d'Indy's 1912 textbook, Cours de Composition Musicale.

The composer describes the scherzo as a novelty, played in harmonics, "whose harmonies involve a syncopated melody in a context that suggests small bamboo rustic flutes (a sort of Panpipe played using the nose by the Pareci Indians of Mato Grosso)".

Discography
In order of date of recordings:
 Villa-Lobos: Quatuors a Cordes Nos. 1–2–3. Quatuor Bessler-Reis (Bernardo Bessler, Michel Bessler, violins; Marie-Christine Springuel, viola; Alceu Reis, cello). Recorded at Studios Master in Rio de Janeiro, July 1988 and September – December 1989. CD recording, 1 disc: digital, 12 cm, stereo. Le Chant du Monde LDC 278 1052. [S.l.]: [S.n.], 1991.
 Also issued as part of Villa-Lobos: Os 17 quartetos de cordas / The 17 String Quartets. Quarteto Bessler-Reis and Quarteto Amazônia. CD recording, 6 sound discs: digital, 12 cm, stereo. Kuarup Discos KCX-1001 (KCD 045, M-KCD-034, KCD 080/1, KCD-051, KCD 042). Rio de Janeiro: Kuarup Discos, 1996.
 Heitor Villa-Lobos: String Quartets Nos. 2 and 7. Danubius Quartet (Mária Zs. Szabó and Adél Miklós, violins; Ágnes Apró, viola; Ilona Ribli, cello). Recorded at the Rottenbiller Street Studio  in Budapest, 12–16 November 1992. CD recording, 1 disc: digital, 12 cm, stereo. Marco Polo 8.223394. A co-production with Records International. Germany: HH International, Ltd., 1994.
 Villa-Lobos: String Quartets, Volume 4. Quartets Nos. 2, 12, 16. Cuarteto Latinoamericano (Saúl Bitrán, Arón Bitrán, violins; Javier Montiel, viola; Alvaro Bitrán, cello). Recorded at the Sala Blas Galindo of the Centro Nacional de las Artes in Mexico City, November and December 1998. Music of Latin American Masters. CD recording, 1 disc: digital, 12 cm, stereo. Dorian DOR-93179. Troy, NY: Dorian Recordings, 1998.
 Reissued as part of Heitor Villa-Lobos: The Complete String Quartets. 6 CDs + 1 DVD with a performance of Quartet No. 1 and interview with the Cuarteto Latinoamericano. Dorian Sono Luminus. DSL-90904. Winchester, VA: Sono Luminus, 2009.
 Also reissued (without the DVD) on Brilliant Classics 6634.

Filmography
 Villa-Lobos: A integral dos quartetos de cordas. Quarteto Radamés Gnattali (Carla Rincón, Francisco Roa, violins; Fernando Thebaldi, viola; Hugo Pilger, cello); presented by Turibio Santos. Recorded from June 2010 to September 2011 at the Palácio do Catete, Palácio das Laranjeiras, and the Theatro Municipal, Rio de Janeiro. DVD and Blu-ray (VIBD11111), 3 discs. Rio de Janeiro: Visom Digital, 2012.

References

Cited sources

Further reading
 Béhague, Gerard. 1979. Music in Latin America: An Introduction. New Jersey: Prentice-Hall.
 Béhaque, Gerard. 1994. Heitor Villa-Lobos: The Search for Brazil's Musical Soul. Austin: Institute of Latin American Studies, University of Texas at Austin.
 Béhague, Gerard. 2003. Villa-Lobos, Heitor: String Quartets, Cuarteto Latinoamericano. [review] Latin American Music Review / Revista de Música Latinoamericana 24, no. 2 (Autumn–Winter): 293–94.
 Estrella, Arnaldo. 1978. Os quartetos de cordas de Villa-Lobos, second edition. Rio de Janeiro: Museu Villa-Lobos, Ministério da Educação e Cultura.
 Farmer, Virginia. 1973. "An Analytical Study of the Seventeen String Quartets of Heitor Villa-Lobos". DMA diss. Urbana: University of Illinois at Urbana-Champaign.
 Gilman, Bruce. 1999. "Enigma de vanguardia", translated by Juan Arturo  Brennan. Pauta: Cuadernos de teoría y crítica musical 17, no. 69 (January–March): 29–34.
  Kraehenbuehl, David. 1957.  "George Rochberg: String Quartet, 1952. (Society for the Publication of American Music, 37th Season, 1956.) New York: Society for the Publication of American Music; distr.: Carl Fischer, 1957; Toch, Ernst. Dedication. For string quartet or string orchestra, with optional bass part. New York: Mills, 1957. Heitor Villa-Lobos: String Quartets, Nos. 4, 7, and 12. New York: Associated Music Publishers, 1956; Ernest Gold: String Quartet No. 1. (Society for the Publication of American Music, 37th Season, 1956.) New York: Society for the Publication of American Music; distr.: Carl Fischer, 1957".  Notes 15, no. 1 (December): 147.
 Macedo Ribeiro, Roberto. 2000. "A escrita contrapontística nos quartetos de cordas de Heitor Villa-Lobos". In Anais do I Colóquio de Pesquisa de Pós-Graduação, edited by Marisa Rezende and Mário Nogueira, 71–76. Rio de Janeiro: Universidade Federal do Rio de Janeiro (UFRJ) (Escola de Música).
 Tarasti, Eero. 2009. "Villa-Lobos's String Quartets". In Intimate Voices: The Twentieth-Century String Quartet, vol. 1: Debussy to Villa-Lobos, edited by Evan Jones, 223–55. Eastman Studies in Music 70. Rochester, NY: University of Rochester Press. ; ; .
 Villa-Lobos, sua obra: Programa de Ação Cultural. 1972. Second edition. Rio de Janeiro: MEC, DAC, Museu Villa-Lobos.
 Villa-Lobos, sua obra. 2009. Version 1.0. MinC / IBRAM, and the Museu Villa-Lobos. Based on the third edition, 1989.

String quartets by Heitor Villa-Lobos
1915 compositions